Triplett Township is a township in Chariton County, in the U.S. state of Missouri.

Triplett Township was established in 1840. The township was named for J. E. M. Triplett, one of the founders of the town of Triplett.

References

Townships in Missouri
Townships in Chariton County, Missouri